Park Jongmun was named the Secretary General of the Constitutional Court of Korea in 2019.

Career 
1978 Jangheung High School
1983 Seoul National University College of Law
1984 26th National Bar Exam
1987 Judicial Research & Training Institute
1990 Judge, Seoul District Court
1992 Judge, Seoul Civil District Court
1994 Judge, Gwangju District Court
1996 Judge, Gwangju High Court
1997 Judge, Seoul District Court
1999 Judge, Seoul High Court
2000 Research Judge, Supreme Court
2002 Presiding Judge, Jeju District Court
2004 Presiding Judge, Ansan Branch, Suwon District Court
2006 Presiding Judge, Seoul Northern District Court
2008 Presiding Judge, Seoul Central District Court
2009 Attorney, One Law Partners, LLC
2012 Representative Attorney, One Law Partners, LLC
2014 President, Hanbit Youth Center 
2017 President, Beautiful Foundation
2019 Secretary General, Constitutional Court

Awards 
2016 Order of Civil Merit Mongnyeon Medal

References

Seoul National University School of Law alumni
1959 births
South Korean judges
Living people